Adoneta pygmaea is a species of slug caterpillar moth in the family Limacodidae.

The MONA or Hodges number for Adoneta pygmaea is 4683.

References

Further reading

 

Limacodidae
Articles created by Qbugbot
Moths described in 1868